Odense–Kerteminde–Martofte Jernbane (OKMJ) was a Danish railway on northeast Funen. Opened in 1900 as Odense–Kjerteminde–Dalby Jernbane (OKDJ), the line was extended in 1914 to the village of Martofte.

The line was closed on 31 March 1966, simultaneously with the two other railways on northern Funen, Nordfyenske Jernbane (NFJ) and Nordvestfyenske Jernbane (OMB).

References

External links 
 OKMJ details at South Funen Heritage Railway's website
 History of OKMJ by Erik V. Pedersen  

Railway lines opened in 1900
Railway companies established in 1900
Railway companies disestablished in 1966
Closed railway lines in Denmark